Centromere protein I is a protein that in humans is encoded by the CENPI gene.

Function 
The product of this gene is involved in the response of gonadal tissues to follicle-stimulating hormone. This gene is also a potential candidate for human X-linked disorders of gonadal development and gametogenesis. CENPI is a target gene of the transcription factor E2F. Additionally, CENPI expression is increased in breast cancer and this has been shown to cause chromosome instability in breast cancer cells.

References

Further reading

External links